Tom Rhodes Radio (also referred to as TRR) is a once or twice-monthly interview podcast hosted by stand up comedian Tom Rhodes. The show launched in March 2011 is an extension of the various travel projects he does while on the road.

Background
The podcast began production in 2009 under Rhodes self-titled production company. Unlike other podcasts, Rhodes has years of experience as a host:  as the first spokesman for Comedy Central in the 90s, a late night talk show host for Kevin Masters Show starring Tom Rhodes in Amsterdam in the early 2000s, a travel host for Yorin Travel, later RTL Travel, and in self-produced travel DVDs Rhode Scholar, which as filmed worldwide at comedy venues and tourist sites,) and Built for Joy. These DVDs feature clips of his performances as well as interviews with interesting locals.

Rhodes, a travel blogger for The Huffington Post, has gone on record saying he would like to star in a comedy travel television show where he can document his personal travels and highlight comedy scenes around the world. Tom produced pilot episodes himself in 2010, filming in Montana and Kuala Lumpur, Malaysia. Since 2009, Rhodes' projects have all incorporated his love of traveling and filming in exotic locales, including a "Honeymoon World Tour" after he married Dutch photographer Ashna Rodjan in 2011. He and his wife filmed during this time, and documented his travels on his blog.

Like fellow comic Louis C.K., Rhodes does self-production of his podcast and his projects. He presents them on his YouTube page. His messages are often political, but are overall amiable. The tagline for the show is "promoting love and laughter in the universe," which is fitting for Rhodes' hippie-style and San Francisco roots. His podcast and travel DVDs can easily be seen as labors of love due to the lack of monetary gain for himself and his own money spent on production.

Reception
Most episodes have featured interviews with comics Tom knew in his early stand-up years, such as Doug Stanhope and Brian Regan. Stanhope is known for his comedic cynicism and called Tom a "very positive person" on the first episode of the show. Janeane Garofalo, also a cynical comic, was quoted in a documentary about Tom's career as saying that Rhodes' laid-back persona would normally "rub her the wrong way," but since Rhodes is upbeat both on and off stage, she enjoys him.

Matador Network, a travel culture website, listed TRR as one of the top podcasts of 2011 due to its humor and diverse guests. Matador's only complaint was the sporadic release of the show, but cited the eclectic guests—comics, his uncle, promoters, and musicians like Tom Rhodes, an indie musician with the same name in North Carolina—as a strong draw. A special episode featured an interview with Tom's sister Laura shortly before she passed from breast cancer.

Episodes

2011

2012

References

External links
 
 21 Podcasts to Listen to - Matador Network

2011 podcast debuts
Audio podcasts
Comedy and humor podcasts
All Things Comedy
American podcasts